The 1997 Coca-Cola World Junior Curling Championships were held in Karuizawa, Japan March 22–30.

Men's

Tiebreaker
 3-2

Playoffs

Women's

Playoffs

Sources

J
World Junior Curling Championships
1997 in Japanese sport
Sport in Nagano Prefecture
International curling competitions hosted by Japan
March 1997 sports events in Asia
1997 in youth sport